Milan Township may refer to the following places in the United States:

 Milan Township, DeKalb County, Illinois
 Milan Township, Allen County, Indiana
 Milan Township, Michigan
 Milan Township, Erie County, Ohio

See also

Milan (disambiguation)

Township name disambiguation pages